Biwer is a commune and small town in eastern Luxembourg. It is part of the canton of Grevenmacher. , the commune has a population of 1,884 inhabitants.

, the town of Biwer, which lies in the east of the commune, has a population of 1,403 inhabitants. Other localities within the commune include, Boudler, Brouch, Hagelsdorf, Wecker, and Weydig.

Population

References

External links
 

 
Communes in Grevenmacher (canton)
Towns in Luxembourg